Samuel Clifford Carroll (October 18, 1859 – June 12, 1923) was an American Major League Baseball outfielder. He played professionally for the Providence Grays, Pittsburgh Alleghenys, Washington Senators, Chicago Colts, St. Louis Browns, and Boston Beaneaters.

Biography
Carroll was born in Clay Grove, Iowa. He played his first professional game on August 3, 1882, for the Providence Grays. Carroll played professionally for eleven seasons from 1882 to 1893.

He stopped playing professionally in 1889 to be a farmer, but missed playing baseball and returned to major league baseball in 1890 with the Chicago Cubs. That season he achieved career highs in three offensive and three defensive categories. Carroll stopped playing in the majors in 1893.

Carroll died at the age of 63 in Portland, Oregon, and is interred at Lincoln Memorial Park.

See also
List of Major League Baseball career stolen bases leaders

References

External links

 Baseball Almanac

1859 births
1923 deaths
Major League Baseball outfielders
Baseball players from Iowa
Washington Senators (1891–1899) players
Pittsburgh Alleghenys players
Providence Grays players
St. Louis Browns (AA) players
Chicago White Stockings players
Boston Beaneaters players
19th-century baseball players
People from Lee County, Iowa
Buffalo Bisons (minor league) players
Detroit Creams players